Parveen Ahmed (born 1930s) is a former Pakistani tennis player.

Career
She played in Singles at the Wimbledon in 1963. She lost to the Brazilian Maria Bueno in the Second Round. She is the first Pakistani female tennis player to compete in the Grand Slam.

Career finals

Singles (4–2)

Doubles (10–8)

References

1930s births
Living people

Year of birth uncertain
Pakistani female tennis players